A complex quadratic polynomial is a quadratic polynomial whose coefficients and variable are complex numbers.

Properties
Quadratic polynomials have the following properties, regardless of the form:

It is a unicritical polynomial, i.e. it has one finite critical point in the complex plane, Dynamical plane consist of maximally 2 basins: basin of infinity and basin of finite critical point ( if finite critical point do not escapes)  
It can be postcritically finite, i.e. the orbit of the critical point can be finite, because the critical point is periodic or preperiodic.
 It is a unimodal function,
 It is a rational function,
 It is an entire function.

Forms
When the quadratic polynomial has only one variable (univariate),  one can distinguish its four main forms:
 The general form:  where 
 The factored form used for the logistic map: 
  which has an indifferent fixed point with multiplier  at the origin
 The monic and centered form, 

The monic and centered  form has been studied extensively, and has the following properties:

 It is the simplest form of a nonlinear function with one coefficient (parameter),
 It is a centered polynomial (the sum of its critical points is zero).
 it is a binomial

The lambda form  is:
 the simplest non-trivial perturbation of unperturbated system 
 "the first family of dynamical systems in which explicit necessary and sufficient conditions are known for when a small divisor problem is stable"

Conjugation

Between forms
Since  is affine conjugate to the general form of the quadratic polynomial it is often used to study complex dynamics and to create images of Mandelbrot, Julia and Fatou sets.

With doubling map
There is semi-conjugacy between the dyadic transformation (the doubling map) and the quadratic polynomial case of c = –2.

Notation

Iteration 
Here  denotes the n-th iterate of the function :

so

Parameter

The monic and centered form  can be marked by:
 the parameter 
 the external angle  of the ray that lands:
 at c in Mandelbrot set on the parameter plane
 on the critical value:z = c in Julia set on the dynamic plane

so :

Examples:
 c is the landing point of the 1/6 external ray of the Mandelbrot set, and is z->z^2+i (where i^2=-1)
 c is the landing point the 5/14 external ray and is z->z^2+c with c = -1.23922555538957 + 0.412602181602004*i

Map
The monic and centered form, sometimes called the Douady-Hubbard family of quadratic polynomials,  is typically used with variable  and parameter :

When it is used as an evolution function of the discrete nonlinear dynamical system

 

it is named the quadratic map:

The Mandelbrot set is the set of values of the parameter c for which the initial condition z0 = 0 does not cause the iterates to diverge to infinity.

Critical items

Critical points

complex plane

 

Since

 

implies

 

 is an initial point for Mandelbrot set iteration.

For the quadratic family  the critical point z = 0 is the center of symmetry of the Julia set Jc, so it is a convex combination of two points in Jc.

extended complex plane
In the Riemann sphere polynomial has 2d-2 critical points. Here zero and infinity are critical points.

Critical value

 

Since

 

we have

 

Critical level curves

A critical level curve  the level curve which contain critical point. It acts as a sort of skeleton of dynamical plane 

Example : level curves cross at saddle point, which is a special type of critical point.

Critical limit set

Critical limit set is the set of forward orbit of all critical points

Critical orbit

The forward orbit of a critical point is called a critical orbit. Critical orbits are very important because every attracting periodic orbit attracts a critical point, so studying the critical orbits helps us understand the dynamics in the Fatou set.

This orbit falls into an attracting periodic cycle if one exists.

Critical sector
The critical sector is a sector of the dynamical plane containing the critical point.

Critical set

Critical set is a set of critical points

Critical polynomial

so

These polynomials are used for:
 finding centers of these Mandelbrot set components of period n. Centers are roots of n-th critical polynomials

 finding roots of Mandelbrot set components of period n (local minimum of )
 Misiurewicz points

Critical curves

Diagrams of critical polynomials are called critical curves.

These curves create the skeleton (the dark lines) of a bifurcation diagram.

Spaces, planes

4D space
One can use the Julia-Mandelbrot 4-dimensional (4D) space for a global analysis of this dynamical system.

In this space there are two basic types of 2D planes:
 the dynamical (dynamic) plane, -plane or  c-plane
 the parameter plane or z-plane

There is also another plane used to analyze such dynamical systems  w-plane: 
 the conjugation plane
 model plane

2D Parameter plane

The phase space of a quadratic map is called its parameter plane. Here:

There is no dynamics here. It is only a set of parameter values. There are no orbits on the parameter plane.

The parameter plane consists of:
 The Mandelbrot set
 The bifurcation locus = boundary of Mandelbrot set with 
 root points
 Bounded hyperbolic components of the Mandelbrot set = interior of Mandelbrot set with internal rays 
 exterior of Mandelbrot set with 
 external rays 
 equipotential lines

There are many different subtypes of the parameter plane.

See also :
 Boettcher map which maps exterior of Mandelbrot set to the exterior of unit disc
 multiplier map which maps interior of hyperbolic component of Mandelbrot set to the interior of unit disc

2D Dynamical plane
"The polynomial Pc maps each dynamical ray to another ray doubling the angle (which we measure in full turns, i.e. 0 = 1 = 2π rad = 360°), and the dynamical rays of any polynomial “look like straight rays” near infinity. This allows us to study the Mandelbrot and Julia sets combinatorially, replacing the dynamical plane by the unit circle, rays by angles, and the quadratic polynomial by the doubling modulo one map." Virpi KaukoOn the dynamical plane one can find:
 The Julia set
 The Filled Julia set
 The Fatou set
 Orbits

The dynamical plane consists of:
 Fatou set
 Julia set

The two-dimensional dynamical plane can be treated as a Poincaré cross-section of three-dimensional space of continuous dynamical system.

Dynamical z-planes can be divided into two groups:
   planes (all other planes for )

Riemann sphere 
The extended complex plane  plus a point at infinity
 the Riemann sphere

Derivatives

First derivative with respect to c
On the parameter plane:
  is a variable
  is constant

 

This derivative can be found by iteration starting with

 

and then replacing at every consecutive step

 

This can easily be verified by using the chain rule for the derivative.

This derivative is used in the distance estimation method for drawing a Mandelbrot set.

First derivative with respect to z
On the dynamical plane:
  is a variable;
  is a constant.

At a fixed point ,

 

At a periodic point z0 of period p the first derivative of a function

 

Its logarithm is known as the Lyapunov exponent. Absolute value of multiplier is used to check the stability of periodic (also fixed) points.

 

and then using

This derivative is used for computing the external distance to the Julia set.

Schwarzian derivative
The Schwarzian derivative (SD for short) of f is:

See also
Misiurewicz point
Periodic points of complex quadratic mappings
Mandelbrot set
Julia set
Milnor–Thurston kneading theory
Tent map
Logistic map

References

External links

Monica Nevins and Thomas D. Rogers, "Quadratic maps as dynamical systems on the p-adic numbers"
Wolf Jung : Homeomorphisms on Edges of the Mandelbrot Set. Ph.D. thesis of 2002
More about Quadratic Maps : https://mathworld.wolfram.com/QuadraticMap.html

Complex dynamics
Fractals
Polynomials